Wayuuzomus is a monotypic genus of hubbardiid short-tailed whipscorpions, first described by Armas & Colmenares in 2006. Its single species, Wayuuzomus gonzalezspongai is distributed in Venezuela.

References 

Schizomida genera
Monotypic arachnid genera